The 1970 Whitewater State Warhawks football team represented Wisconsin State University—Whitewater—now known as the University of Wisconsin–Whitewater—as a member of the Wisconsin State University Conference (WSUC) during the 1970 NAIA football season. In their fifteenth year under coach Forrest Perkins, the Warhawks compiled an overall record of 6–4, and a mark of 5–3 in conference play, placing third in the WSUC.

The 1970 season was the team's first in Warhawks Stadium, which was later renamed Perkins Stadium in honor of Coach Perkins. The stadium was dedicated with a Neil Diamond concert on September 11, the night before Whitewater State's first home game.

Schedule

References 

Whitewater State
Wisconsin–Whitewater Warhawks football seasons
Whitewater State Warhawks football